LaVonte Dority (born October 28, 1991) is an American professional basketball player who last played for T71 Dudelange of the Total League.

Professional career

Den Helder Suns
On July 15, 2017, Dority signed his first professional contract with the Den Helder Suns of the Dutch Basketball League (DBL). The team acquired Dority as it was looking for a player with "experience and a strong appearance." On February 15, 2018, Dority scored a season-high 33 points in an 85–83 win over BAL. As the starting point guard of Den Helder, he finished the 2017–18 season with Den Helder in the eight place of the regular season. Dority averaged 14.5 points and 2.8 assists over 30 games.

Dutch Windmills
On December 3, 2018, Dority was announced by Dutch club Dutch Windmills where he signed for the remainder of the 2018–19 season. On April 10, 2019, Windmills withdrew from the DBL due to its financial problems.

T71 Dudelange
In July 2019, Dority signed with T71 Dudelange of the Luxembourgian Total League.

References

External links
Valparaiso Crusaders bio

1991 births
Living people
American expatriate basketball people in Germany
American expatriate basketball people in Italy
American expatriate basketball people in the Netherlands
American men's basketball players
Basketball players from Chicago
Den Helder Suns players
Dutch Windmills players
Point guards
South Florida Bulls men's basketball players
Valparaiso Beacons men's basketball players
VfL Kirchheim Knights players